Listed below are the dates and results for the 1990 FIFA World Cup qualification rounds for the Oceanian zone (OFC).

Five teams entered the competition: OFC members Australia, New Zealand and Fiji, and non-OFC members Israel and Chinese Taipei. The Oceanian zone was allocated 0.5 places (out of 24) in the final tournament.

Format
There were two rounds of play. In the first round Israel received a bye and advanced to the second round directly. The remaining four teams were paired up to play knockout matches on a home-and-away basis, with the aggregate winners advancing to the second round.

In the second round, the three remaining teams played against each other in a group on a home-and-away basis. The group winner advanced to the play-off against the CONMEBOL group winner with the weakest record.

First round

|}

Matches

New Zealand won 8–1 on aggregate and advanced to the Second round.

Australia won 5–2 on aggregate and advanced to the Second round.

Second round

Matches

Inter-confederation play-offs

The winning team of the OFC qualification tournament played the CONMEBOL group winner with the weakest record in a home-and-away play-off. The winner of this play-off qualified for the 1990 FIFA World Cup.

Goalscorers

4 goals

 Charlie Yankos
 Darren McClennan
 Billy Wright

3 goals

 Graham Arnold
 Malcolm Dunford

2 goals

 Paul Trimboli
 Eli Ohana
 Ronny Rosenthal

1 goal

 Oscar Crino
 Warren Spink
 Loten Dalai
 Ravuame Madigi
 Nir Klinger
 Noel Barkley
 Danny Halligan

1 own goal

 Garry Lund (playing against Chinese Taipei)

See also
1990 FIFA World Cup qualification
1990 FIFA World Cup qualification (CONMEBOL–OFC play-off)

References

External links

 
OFC
FIFA World Cup qualification (OFC)
qual
qual